Richard Gasquet and Jo-Wilfried Tsonga were the defending champions, but both chose not to participate that year.

Bob Bryan and Mike Bryan won in the final 6–1, 7–6(7–3), against Daniel Nestor and Nenad Zimonjić.

Seeds

Draw

Draw

External links
Main Draw

Medibank International Sydney - Men's Doubles
Men